Eberhard VI/II (1 February 1447 (?) in Waiblingen – 17 February 1504 at Lindenfels Castle) was a German nobleman.  He was Count of Württemberg-Stuttgart from 1480 to 1496 as Eberhard VI, then Duke of Württemberg from 1496 to June 1498 as Eberhard II.

Early life
Eberhard was the son of Ulrich V, Count of Württemberg and Elisabeth of Bavaria-Landshut. He spent much of his youth at the Burgundian court. In 1461 he took part in the coronation of King Louis XI of France in Reims. In 1462 he returned to Württemberg. Between 1465 and 1467 he married Margravine Elisabeth of Brandenburg, a daughter of Margrave Albrecht III of Brandenburg.

Succession and reign
As early as 1477 a family treaty secured him the succession in Württemberg-Urach, which was ruled by Count Eberhard V, nicknamed the bearded one, who left no legitimate offspring. In 1480 he took over rule from his father Count Ulrich V.
In 1482 he signed the Treaty of Münsingen with Eberhard V. This treaty reunited Württemberg by transferring power from Eberhard VI to Eberhard V of Württemberg-Urach. In return Eberhard VI was granted the succession to Eberhard V.
Thus from 1482 until the death of Eberhard V, he was nominally sovereign, but in reality he was powerless. He soon fought against this deprivation of power, but could do nothing against his older rival. In 1489 his right of succession, previously over the whole of Württemberg, was even limited by Eberhard V to Württemberg-Stuttgart only. However, after the death of Eberhard, who had assumed the title of Duke Eberhard I in 1495, he achieved sovereignty over the whole of rule in all of Württemberg as Duke Eberhard II.

Deposition, exile and death
But he soon ran into trouble with the nobility, who disempowered him, working in close collaboration with the Habsburg King Maximilian I. He had to flee to Ulm. As Eberhard found no support he had to accept the Arbitration of Horb of Maximilian I in 1498. He accepted an annual pension of 6,000 guilders in return for his deposition and banishment. In his place a council of the estates of the realm ruled with royal authority. This situation did not change until his nephew Ulrich, the son of his brother Heinrich, was prematurely declared to be of age in 1503 and assumed power as Duke of Württemberg.
Eberhard was granted asylum by Elector Palatine Philip. He died in exile in Castle Lindenfels in the Palatinate in 1504. He is buried in the collegiate church of Heidelberg.

Ancestors

Literature 
 Dieter Stievermann. Eberhard VI./II, in Sönke Lorenz, Dieter Mertens, Volker Press eds. Das Haus Württemberg: Ein biographisches Lexikon. Kohlhammer Verlag, Stuttgart 1997, S. 98–100

1447 births
1504 deaths
15th-century dukes of Württemberg
Burials at the Church of the Holy Spirit, Heidelberg